The 2003–04 Newcastle United season was the final season of the National Soccer League. Newcastle finished 11th on the table, failing to qualify for the NSL finals.

First-team squad
Squad at end of season

Results

National Soccer League

Final standings

See also

Newcastle Jets FC seasons
Newcastle United